François Mireur (February 5, 1770 – July 9, 1798) was a French general who is notable for having sung the "War Song for the Army of the Rhine", later known as La Marseillaise, in 1792 when he volunteered for the newly created republican army. He later served under Napoleon Bonaparte and was killed in Egypt in 1798.

Biography 

Mireur was born in Escragnolles in 1770, and studied as a medicinal doctor at the Faculty of Medicine in Montpellier. In 1792, he became a doctor, but volunteered for the army shortly afterwards. That year, he sang Rouget de Lisle's war song when he was headed to Marseilles to organize and lead volunteers from nearby towns. The song thus became known as "La Marseillaise", which was adopted as the French national anthem in 1795. During the war, he fought at the Battle of Valmy and later served in the Italian Campaign of Napoleon, twice refusing the rank of general. In 1798, he was promoted to general and served alongside Louis Desaix in the Egyptian Campaign, where he fought the Mamelukes and Ottomans. It was in this war that Mireur met his end. While riding a newly purchased Arabian stallion, after only a short distance, he was ambushed by three Mamelukes, and killed before he could call for help.  His name was inscribed on the 28th pillar of the Arc de Triomphe at the top of the south pillar, near the avenue Kleber. He was honored as a national hero because of his role in popularising the Marseillaise.

In popular culture 
 In the 1989 film La Révolution française, an unnamed boy of about 10 years old is portrayed whistling La Marseillaise when he runs into a group of fédérés from Marseille marching to Paris. When a passing soldier stops and gathers some other soldiers around him to ask the boy about the song, the boy responds he heard a carpenter in Strasbourg sing it, and sings the lines: Aux armes, citoyens / Formez vos bataillons / Marchons, marchons !... In the next scene, fédéré companies from all around France marching on Paris are seen adopting the song. The boy is likely a reference to Mireur, who, however, would have been 22 years old at the time.

References

French Republican military leaders of the French Revolutionary Wars
1770 births
1798 deaths
French generals
French Republican military leaders killed in the French Revolutionary Wars
People from Alpes-Maritimes
Names inscribed under the Arc de Triomphe